Demetrida limbata is a species of ground beetle in Lebiinae subfamily. It was described by Fauvel in 1882.

References

Beetles described in 1882
Taxa named by Charles Adolphe Albert Fauvel
limbata